Dick Parsons may refer to:
 Dick Parsons (British Army officer) (1910–1998), British Army officer and marksman
 Dick Parsons (coach) (born 1938), American college baseball and basketball coach
 Richard Parsons (businessman) (born 1948), American business executive